Waiting in the Wings may refer to:

Waiting in the Wings (play), a 1960 play by Noël Coward
"Waiting in the Wings" (Angel), a 2002 episode of the American television series, Angel
"Waiting in the Wings", a song by Diana Ross from her 1991 album, The Force Behind the Power
Waiting in the Wings (Seventh Wonder album)
Waiting in the Wings (Daryl Stuermer album), 2001
Waiting in the Wings: The Musical, a 2015 film featuring Shirley Jones
Waiting in the Wings (film), a 1965 Australian TV play
"Waiting in the Wings", a song from season 2 of Rapunzel's Tangled Adventure